Masonic Block may refer to:

Masonic Block (Reading, Massachusetts)
Masonic Block building within Casselton Commercial Historic District, Casselton, North Dakota
Masonic Block (Fargo, North Dakota)

See also
List of Masonic buildings
Masonic Temple (disambiguation)
Masonic Lodge (disambiguation)
Masonic Building (disambiguation)